John Stuart (born John Alfred Louden Croall; 18 July 1898 – 17 October 1979), was a Scottish actor, and a very popular leading man in British silent films in the 1920s. He appeared in three films directed by Alfred Hitchcock.

Biography 
The Gary Cooper pub in Dunstable stands as a tribute to one of the Hollywood greats, but if fate had taken a different direction the pub could have been called The John Stuart. Cooper and Stuart were contemporaries in 1912 at Dunstable Grammar School – now Ashton Middle School – in High Street North. Both went into acting, but while Cooper went on to win two Oscars for Sergeant York and High Noon, Stuart stayed in Britain and is virtually forgotten. 

Yet his career spanned 59 years, during which he made more than 160 films and 60 TV dramas and serials, and appeared in about 150 plays. His films started with silent movies and ended in 1978 with a bit part in the blockbuster Superman. 

His career could have been even more stellar but for a decision he made in 1928. Just as he seemed to be on the brink of a lucrative career in US films, with the offer of a five-year contract at £25,000 a year by Paramount, Stuart opted to stay at home and support the struggling British industry. 

But even at home, Stuart was still a major star, cementing his place with the leading role in Kitty, the first British talkie (1928 silent version, 1929 sound added), in which he was an outstanding success and prompting the Sunday Dispatch to write: “Quite definitely proves himself to be one of the finest picture actors in the world.” 

Four years earlier he had taken the starring role in Alfred Hitchcock’s directorial debut, The Pleasure Garden. 

John Stuart was born John Croall in Edinburgh, Scotland. in 1898. He moved to London with his family aged 7 and was sent to board at Dunstable Grammar School, where he overlapped with the younger Gary Cooper in his final year. Writing of Cooper, Stuart said: “We had never seen each other since those school days of 1912, and then we met just a few months before he died [in 1961], when I happened to be working in the same studio at the time he was making his last film The Naked Edge. 

“I went on the set to see him and we talked about the old days and had many a laugh. We were photographed together, and I shall always treasure the souvenir I have of that occasion.” 

Stuart developed his interest in theatre at Dunstable GS, on one occasion selling his school books and playing truant to see a production of Hamlet! But at 13 his parents’ marriage broke up and he went to live with his father in Eastbourne. It was at Eastbourne College that he really started to act. 

After leaving school, he worked in the family chassis-building firm and when the Great War broke out, he joined the Black Watch at 19 but was invalided out with trench fever. 

To family disapproval, he decided to try his luck in the theatre and became an extra in The Trojan Women at the Old Vic and had to stop Sybil Thorndike from jumping off the walls of Troy. On the strength of his claim in his CV, that he had been “supporting Miss Thorndike at the Vic”, he found a job with a touring company. 

He landed his first film role immediately after the tour in 1920, aged 21 and with a new surname. Thanks to a piece of good luck, he was at a dinner party with the director Walter West, who was making a film called Her Son. Because he resembled West’s wife, Violet Hopson, who was playing the part of the mother, he was signed up. 

According to Studio magazine the stars of the film were “delighted with his fresh and natural performance”. And Picture Show magazine wrote: “John Stuart played so easily, without a trace of self-consciousness – he is the ideal type for romance.” 

His reputation and popularity grew rapidly, and role after role came his way. Within a year he was playing leading men, causing Picturegoer magazine to comment: “Along with Rudolph Valentino, John Barrymore and Ivor Novello, John Stuart is among the masculines who can wear fantastic clothes and get away with it.” 

In a Picture-goer competition in 1927, he and Novello were the only British stars to make the top ten famous film lovers, alongside John Barrymore, John Gilbert, Ronald Colman and Douglas Fairbanks. 

In six years he made 23 films and 20 shorts, and in 1933 alone, he made 12 films in as many months. The Daily Chronicle said: “John Stuart is very easily the best leading man in British pictures”, while Era film critic R. B. Marriott called him a genius. The Daily Sketch said: “He has been called the English Valentino.”  

In 1928, the Sunday Express reported: “John Stuart has admirers all over the world and his fan mail now averages several hundred letters a week.” He was president of his own fan club, which published a thrice-yearly magazine, organised events that Stuart and other stars attended and had several hundred members. At one event the former DGS truant was surrounded by cheering girls, and had to be rescued by stewards.  

The turning point in his career came after the release of Kitty when he was screen-tested by Paramount and offered the five-year contract at £25,000 a year – but turned it down. In later years he said: “I still wonder if I did the right thing.”  

A year later it seemed that he might get a second chance of Hollywood fame when Douglas Fairbanks and Mary Pickford interviewed him. She was looking for “an Adonis” to help her to break out of the roles where she often played characters half her age. News leaked, and one report said: “He means to work for British films only and help make us the world leaders of the film industry.” He heard no more.  

Sadly, his career also stalled somewhat in the 1930s because of inferior films he was obliged to make under his contract with British-Gaumont Studios, and work tailed off during the Second World War. He tried to join up but was deemed unfit because of his earlier trench fever, so joined the Home Guard. Inevitably, as he approached his 50s at the end of the War, there were fewer leading roles and spells of unemployment. His days as a star were over, although for the best part of 30 years he continued to work, combining countless stage appearances and small parts in films with radio and TV appearances. He appeared with Sam Kydd in Sink The Bismarck!, Mr Denning Drives North, Further Up The Creek and Too Many Crooks in the 1950s but it isn’t known whether they knew they were both Old Dunstablians!  

At the height of his popularity he told Picturegoer: “The screen has cost me myself. Always I am John Stuart the actor. Sometimes I have to run away from crowds. The person that cinema-goers mob is the black and white shadow player. I love being a shadow on the screen but sometimes I wish I could rid myself of my shadow double when the cameras cease to turn.”  

Three times married and with two sons, Stuart made his final film appearance in Superman (1978), alongside Marlon Brando as an Elder of Krypton. He died a year later, aged 81. 

His first talkie Kitty (1929) was a successful production. His last role was in the film Superman (1978), as a Kryptonian elder.

He is buried in Brompton Cemetery, London.

His son, Jonathan Croall, wrote a 2012 book about the screen idols of the 1920s, with much previously unpublished personal and professional information about his father.

Filmography

 Her Son (1920) as Min Gascoyne
 The Great Gay Road (1920) as Rodney Foster
 The Lights of Home (1920) as Philip Compton
 Land of My Fathers (1921) as David Morgan
 Sinister Street (1922) as Michael Fane
 The Little Mother (1922) as Jack
 A Sporting Double (1922) as Will Blunt
 If Four Walls Told (1922) as Cuthbert
 This Freedom (1923) as Huggo Occleve
 The Mistletoe Bough (1923) as Lord Lovell
 Little Miss Nobody (1923) as Guy Cheviot
 The School for Scandal (1923) as Charles Surface
 The Reverse of the Medal (1923) as Pilot
 The Loves of Mary, Queen of Scots (1923) as George Douglas
 Constant Hot Water (1923) as 
 His Grace Gives Notice (1924) as Joseph Longley
 The Alley of Golden Hearts (1924) as Jack
 Her Redemption (1924) as Jack Latimer
 We Women (1925) as Michael Rivven
 A Daughter of Love (1925) as Dudley Bellairs
 Venetian Lovers (1925) as Bob Goring
 Parted (1925) as The Tourist
 The Pleasure Garden (1925) as Hugh Fielding
 London Love (1926) as Harry Raymond
 Mademoiselle from Armentieres (1927) as Johnny
 Roses of Picardy (1927) as Lieutenant Skene
 The Glad Eye (1927) as Maurice
 Hindle Wakes (1927) as Allan Jeffcote
 The Flight Commander (1927) as John Massey
 A Woman in Pawn (1927) as James Rawdon
 Sailors Don't Care (1928) as Slinger Woods
 Mademoiselle Parley Voo (1928) as John
 Yacht of the Seven Sins (1928) as Kilian Gurlitt
 Smashing Through (1929) as Richard Bristol
 High Seas (1929) as Tiny Bracklethorpe
 Kitty (1929) as Alex St. George
 Taxi for Two (1929) as Jack Devenish
 Atlantic (1929) as Lawrence
 Elstree Calling (1930)
 The Nipper (1930) as Max Nicholson
 No Exit (1930) as Bill Alden
 Kissing Cup's Race (1930) as Lord Jimmy Hilhoxton
 Children of Chance (1930) as Gordon
 Hindle Wakes (1931) as Alan Jeffcote
 In a Monastery Garden (1932) as Michael Ferrier
 The Hound of the Baskervilles (1932) as Sir Henry Baskerville
 Verdict of the Sea (1932) as Gentleman Burton
 Number Seventeen (1932) as Barton - the Detective
 Men of Steel (1932) as James 'Iron' Harg
 The Mistress of Atlantis (1932) as Lt. Saint-Avit
 The Lost Chord (1933) as David Graham
 This Week of Grace (1933) as Henry Baring
 Head of the Family (1933) as Bill Stanmore
 Mayfair Girl (1933) as Robert Blair
 Enemy of the Police (1933) as John Meakin
 The Wandering Jew (1933) as Pietro Morelli
 The House of Trent (1933) as John Trent
 The Pointing Finger (1933) as Lord Rollestone
 Naughty Cinderella (1933) as Michael Wynard
 Mr. Quincey of Monte Carlo (1933) as Mr. Quincey
 Love's Old Sweet Song (1933) as Paul Kingslake
 Little Fella (1933) as Major Tony Griffiths
 Home, Sweet Home (1933) as Richard Pelham
 Bella Donna (1934) as Nigel Armine
 The Black Abbot (1934) as Frank Brooks
 The Four Masked Men (1934) as Trevor Phillips
 Grand Prix (1934) as Jack Holford
 The Blue Squadron (1934) as Colonel Mario Spada
 The Green Pack (1934) as Larry Dean
 Blind Justice (1934) as John Summers
 D'Ye Ken John Peel? (1935) as Captain Moonlight / Captain Freeman
 Royal Cavalcade (1935) as Explorer in Tent
 Lend Me Your Husband (1935) as Jeff Green
 Once a Thief (1935) as Roger Drummond
 Abdul the Damned (1935) as Capt. Talak-Bey
 The Secret Voice (1936) as Jim Knowles
 Reasonable Doubt (1936) as Noel Hampton
 The Elder Brother (1937) as Ronald Bellairs
 Pearls Bring Tears (1937) as Harry Willshire
 The Show Goes On (1937) as Mack McDonald
 Talking Feet (1937) as Dr. Roger Hood
 The Claydon Treasure Mystery (1938) as Peter Kerrigan
 Old Mother Riley in Society (1940) as Tony Morgan
 Old Mother Riley's Ghosts (1941) as John Cartwright
 The Seventh Survivor (1942) as Robert Cooper
 Ships with Wings (1942) as Commdr. Hood
 The Big Blockade (1942) as Royal Navy: Naval Officer
 Penn of Pennsylvania (1942) as Bindle
 The Missing Million (1942) as Inspector Dicker
 Banana Ridge (1942) as Chief Police Officer Staples
 Hard Steel (1942) as Alan Saunders
 Flying Fortress (1942) as Captain Harvey (uncredited)
 Women Aren't Angels (1943) as Major Gaunt
 Headline (1944) as L.B. Ellington
 Candles at Nine (1944) as William Gardener - Turf Commission
 Madonna of the Seven Moons (1945) as Giuseppe
 The Phantom Shot (1947) as Inspector Webb
 Mine Own Executioner (1947) as Dr. John Hayling
 Mrs. Fitzherbert (1947) as Duke of Bedford
 House of Darkness (1948) as Crabtree - the Solicitor
 Escape from Broadmoor (1948, short) as Inspector Thornton
 Third Time Lucky (1949) as Inspector
 The Temptress (1949) as Sir Charles Clifford
 The Man from Yesterday (1949) as Gerald Amersley
 Man on the Run (1949) as Det. Inspector Jim McBane
 The Magic Box (1951) as 2nd Platform Man at Connaught
 Mr. Denning Drives North (1952) as Wilson
 The Ringer (1952) as Gardener
 Mantrap (1953) as Doctor
 Street Corner (1953) as Magistrate
 Four Sided Triangle (1953) as Solicitor
 Front Page Story (1954) as Counsel for the Prosecution
 The Men of Sherwood Forest (1954) as Moraine
 The Gilded Cage (1955) as Harding
 John and Julie (1955) as Palace Policeman
 Alias John Preston (1955) as Dr. Underwood
 It's a Great Day (1955) as Detective Inspector Marker
 Tons of Trouble (1956) as Doctor
 Johnny, You're Wanted (1956) as Surgeon
 Raiders of the River (1956) as Mr. Hampton
 The Last Man to Hang? (1956) as Magistrate
 Eyewitness (1956) as Chief Constable
 Five Clues to Fortune (1957) as Abbot
 Quatermass 2 (1957) as Commissioner
 The Naked Truth (1957) as Police Inspector
 The Betrayal (1957) as War Crimes Commissioner
 Three Sundays to Live (1957) as The Judge (uncredited)
 The Revenge of Frankenstein (1958) as Inspector
 Blood of the Vampire (1958) as Uncle Phillippe
 Chain of Events (1958) as Bank Manager
 Further Up the Creek (1958) as Admiral
 The Secret Man (1958) as Dr. Warren
 Too Many Crooks (1959) as Inspector Jensen
 The Mummy (1959) as Coroner
 Sink the Bismarck! (1960) as Captain Ralph Kerr (Hood)
 Bottoms Up (1960) as Police Officer
 Village of the Damned (1960) as Professor Smith
 Compelled (1960) as Book man
 Pit of Darkness (1961) as Lord Barnsford (uncredited)
 Danger by My Side (1962) as Prison Governor
 Paranoiac (1963) as Williams
 The Scarlet Blade (1964) as Beverley (uncredited)
 Young Winston (1972) as Speaker Peel
 Royal Flash (1975) as English General
 Superman'' (1978) as 10th Elder (Krypton Council)

References

External links

 
 

1898 births
1979 deaths
Scottish male film actors
Scottish male silent film actors
Male actors from Edinburgh
Burials at Brompton Cemetery
20th-century Scottish male actors